San Carlos River may refer to:
 San Carlos River (Argentina), a river of Mendoza Province
 San Carlos River (Costa Rica)
 San Carlos River (Falkland Islands)
 San Carlos River (Panama), a river of Panama
 San Carlos River (Paraguay)
 San Carlos River (United States)
 San Carlos River (Venezuela), a river of Venezuela

See also
San Carlos Water, a bay in the Falkland Islands